The 2013 São Paulo Challenger de Tênis was a professional tennis tournament played on outdoor clay courts. It was the first edition of the tournament which was part of the 2013 ATP Challenger Tour and the 2013 ITF Women's Circuit, offering $50,000 in prize money for the men's event and $10,000 for the women's event. It took place in São Paulo, Brazil, on 29 July – 4 August 2013.

Men's entrants

Seeds 

 1 Rankings as of 22 July 2013

Other entrants 
The following players received wildcards into the singles main draw:
  Marcelo Demoliner
  Tiago Fernandes
  Fernando Romboli
  Carlos Eduardo Severino

The following player received entry with a protected ranking:
  Eduardo Schwank

The following players received entry as alternates:
  Gonzalo Lama
  Tiago Lopes

The following players received entry from the qualifying draw:
  Christian Garín
  Christian Lindell
  Alexandre Schnitman
  Bruno Semenzato

The following player received entry into the singles main draw as a lucky loser:
  Marcelo Tebet Filho

Women's entrants

Seeds 

 1 Rankings as of 22 July 2013

Other entrants 
The following players received wildcards into the singles main draw:
  Suellen Abel
  Maria Vitória Beirão
  Leticia Nayara Moura Monteiro
  Maria Silva

The following players received entry from the qualifying draw:
  Marcela Alves Pereira Valle
  Carla Bruzzesi Avella
  Juliana Rocha Cardoso
  Gabriela Ferreira Sanabria
  Leticia Garcia Vidal
  Barbara Gueno
  Barbara Oliveira
  Luisa Stefani

The following player received entry into the singles main draw as a lucky loser:
  Marcela Guimarães Bueno

Champions

Men's singles 

  Alejandro González def.  Eduardo Schwank 6–2, 6–3

Women's singles 

  Bianca Botto def.  Gabriela Cé 7–6(7–2), 5–7, 6–2

Men's doubles 

  Fernando Romboli /  Eduardo Schwank def.  Marcelo Arévalo /  Nicolás Barrientos 6–7(6–8), 6–4, [10–8]

Women's doubles 

  Laura Pigossi /  Carolina Zeballos def.  Nathália Rossi /  Luisa Stefani 6–3, 6–4

External links 
 ITF Search
 ATP official site

2013 ATP Challenger Tour
2013 ITF Women's Circuit
2013 in Brazilian tennis